This is a list of episodes for the eighth and final season (1982–83) of the NBC television series Quincy, M.E..

In this season, Anita Gillette joins the cast as Dr. Emily Hanover, and the opening theme is again rearranged to sound more electronic.

Episodes

References

External links
 

1982 American television seasons
1983 American television seasons